Ödemiş is a district of İzmir Province of Turkey, as well as the name of its central town (urban population 75,577 as of 2012), located 113 km southeast of the city of İzmir.

About 4 km north of Ödemiş town are the ruins of Hypaepa. The historical importance of the region is also reflected by the small town of Birgi, east of Ödemiş, which was the capital of the Aydınids, which has examples of Seljuq and Ottoman architecture. Birgi has been on the UNESCO World Cultural Heritage list since 1994, and points of interest here include Çakırağa Mansion, İmam-i Birgivi Medrese and Sultanşah Mausoleum.
Ödemiş is famous for its potatoes, which has the best quality in Turkey, as well as its "Ödemiş Kebab". The city is the biggest potato grower of Turkey with its annual 350.000 tons of potato production.

History
From 1867 until 1922, Ödemiş was part of the Aidin Vilayet of the Ottoman Empire.

Transport
See also:
 Ödemiş railway station
 Basmane-Ödemiş Regional – the railway service from Basmane Terminal in İzmir.

Notable people
 Muzafer Sherif  (1906-1988), a Turkish-American social psychologist
 Çakırcalı Mehmet Efe (1872 kayaköy-Ödemiş – ö. 17 Kasım 1911 ) the legendary hero
 Gökçen Efe (1881-1919), folk hero of the Turkish War of Independence
 Şükrü Saracoğlu, 5th Prime Minister of Turkey

References

External links
 https://web.archive.org/web/20080415075630/http://www.odemisnet.com/

Populated places in İzmir Province
 
Districts of İzmir Province